During the 1996–97 English football season, Sunderland competed in the FA Premier League (known as the FA Carling Premiership for sponsorship reasons).

Season summary
Just one year after they had almost slipped into Division Two, Sunderland had returned to the top flight under new manager Peter Reid. With a new 42,000-seat stadium due to be ready in the summer of 1997, Reid and his players were determined to secure survival in the final season at historic Roker Park and give the new stadium at Monkwearmouth a debut season in the Premiership.

The first half of the season went well for club, finding themselves in a comfortable 11th position by the end of January, boasting a strong home form going into the February. However, a run of 4 consecutive defeats against Aston Villa, Leeds United, Blackburn Rovers and Tottenham Hospur saw them slip down to 16th by March.

Sunderland lost 1–0 to Wimbledon on the final day of the season; with Coventry City's win at Tottenham, the Wearsiders were relegated.

On a high note, Sunderland did manage to beat Chelsea (3–0), Arsenal (1–0) and Manchester United (2–1) all at home during the season.

Final league table

Results summary

Results by round

Results
Sunderland's score comes first

Legend

FA Premier League

FA Cup

League Cup

Players

First-team squad
Squad at end of season

Reserve squad

Appearances and goals

|-
! colspan=14 style=background:#dcdcdc; text-align:center| Goalkeepers

|-
! colspan=14 style=background:#dcdcdc; text-align:center| Defenders

|-
! colspan=14 style=background:#dcdcdc; text-align:center| Midfielders

|-
! colspan=14 style=background:#dcdcdc; text-align:center| Forwards

|-
|}

Transfers

In

Out

Transfers in:  £4,150,000
Transfers out:  £160,000
Total spending:  £3,990,000

Notes

References

Sunderland A.F.C. seasons
Sunderland